Professor Bissan Al-Lazikani PhD FRSB MBCS is a data scientist and drug discoverer. She applies computational techniques to help solve critical bottlenecks in cancer drug discovery and development. Since 2021 she has been professor of genomic medicine at The University of Texas MD Anderson Cancer Center.

Education 
She studied as an undergraduate at UCL in molecular biology. Her M.Sc in Computer Science is from Imperial College and she has a PhD in Computational Biology from Cambridge University, where she was supervised by Cyrus Chothia.

Career 
Professor Bissan Al-Lazikani is formally trained in molecular biology and computer science: BSc (Hons) in molecular biology from UCL, MSc in Computer Science from Imperial College then PhD in Computational Biology from the Cambridge University. Subsequently, she became a Howard Hughes postdoctoral fellow at the laboratories of Professor Barry Honig in Columbia University, New York, where she focused on structure analysis, prediction and modelling for the purpose of understanding the basis of ligand-receptor interactions. After that, she joined a London-based biotechnology company, Inpharmatica, where she led a team to develop chemogenomics databases and tools to aid target prioritisation and drug discovery. These are now available to the community via a Wellcome strategic award through the ChEMBL resources at the European Bioinformatics Institute (EBI).

She joined the Institute of Cancer Research, London, in 2009 to establish and lead the Computational Biology and Chemogenomics Team in order to innovate and apply computational techniques to cancer drug discovery, in a long-term collaboration with Professor Paul Workman FRS. She then led the creation of the world’s largest cancer knowledge base, canSAR, as well as the novel, Big Data-driven approaches for objective and systematic evaluation of therapeutic targets for cancer. She also led the creation of ProbeMiner, a data-driven Chemical Probe assessment resource. She was appointed head of the Department of Data Science at the ICR. In this role, she led the creation of The Knowledge Hub, a multidisciplinary, AI-enabled environment for clinical research and therapy stratification.

In 2021 she joined MD Anderson Cancer Center, in Houston, Texas, where she is Director of Therapeutics Data Science, Professor in the Department of Genomic Medicine and founding faculty of MD Anderson’s Institute of Data Science for Oncology (IDSO).

She is a joint applicant for the Wellcome Biomedical Resource award as well as the Director of Informatics and Technologies for the Chemical Probes Portal. She is vice-chair of the Cancer Research UK Early Detection and Diagnosis Expert Panel. She serves on numerous scientific advisory boards and funding panels, and is a Fellow of The Royal Society of Biology, and a member of the British Computer Society.

Her published works have specialised in drug discovery, genomics, small molecule drug discovery and new drug discovery. As of April 2022 she is associated with more than 100 scientific works, cited over 15,000 times with an impact factor of 36. She has also worked in the commercial sector.

References 

Living people
British bioinformaticians
21st-century British biologists
21st-century British women scientists
Alumni of University College London
Year of birth missing (living people)
Place of birth missing (living people)
Alumni of Imperial College London
Alumni of the University of Cambridge
Academics of the Institute of Cancer Research